Thomas Manning may refer to:
 Thomas Manning (sinologist) (1772–1840), Chinese studies scholar and the first Englishman to enter Lhasa
 Thomas Manning (bishop), Tudor prior and bishop
 Thomas A. Manning (1886–1944), American politician
 Thomas Courtland Manning (1825–1887), American jurist
 Thomas Henry Manning (1911–1998),  British-Canadian Arctic explorer, biologist, geographer, zoologist, and author
 Thomas Manning (priest), Archdeacon of Totnes, 1453
 Thomas Manning (cricketer) (1884–1975), English cricketer
 Tom Manning (comics), fictional character from the Dark Horse Comics universe
 Tom Manning (murderer) (1946–2019), American murderer and bank robber
 Tom Manning (American football) (born 1983), American football coach